Sexagesima , or, in full, Sexagesima Sunday, is the name for the second Sunday before Ash Wednesday in the pre-1970 Roman Rite liturgical calendar of the Catholic Church, and also in that of some Protestant denominations, particularly those with Lutheran and Anglican origins. Sexagesima falls within the liturgical period of Shrovetide.

Significance
On Sexagesima, individuals are encouraged to evaluate their current spiritual state and prepare themselves to enter the season of Lent. Such preparations can include confession and such reflections as would be profitable and in keeping with the themes of Septuagesima.

Etymology and timing
The name "Sexagesima" is derived from the Latin sexagesimus, meaning "sixtieth", and appears to be a back-formation of Quinquagesima, the term formerly used to denote the last Sunday before Lent. The latter name alluding to the fact that there are fifty days between that Sunday and Easter, if one counts both days themselves in the total as was the usual custom of the Roman Empire. 

Through the same process, the Sunday before Sexagesima Sunday was formerly known as Septuagesima Sunday, and marked the start of the Pre-Lenten Season which eventually became the time for carnival celebrations throughout Europe. This custom was later exported to places settled or colonized by Europeans. 

While Quinquagesima (50th day) is mathematically correct, allowing for the inclusive counting, Sexagesima and Septuagesima are only approximations. The exact number of days are 57 and 64 respectively. The earliest Sexagesima can occur is January 25 and the latest is February 28, or February 29 in a leap year.

Observation

Anglican Church
The 1662 Book of Common Prayer, used in some Anglican provinces, retains Sexagesima Sunday (along with Septuagesima and Quinquagesima), as do the 1928 American Book of Common Prayer  and the 1962 Canadian Book of Common Prayer.

Latin Catholic Church

Following the Second Vatican Council, Sexagesima and the other pre-Lent Sundays were eliminated in the new Roman Catholic liturgical calendar. These reforms went into effect in 1970. Most provinces of the Anglican Communion later followed in abolishing Sexagesima and the other pre-Lent Sundays, though they are retained wherever the Prayer Book Calendar is followed. The earlier form of the Roman Rite, with its references to Quinquagesima, Sexagesima and Septuagesima, continues to be observed in some communities.

See also
Ordinary Time
Three Sundays of Commemoration

References

External links
Lections and resources for Sexagesima Sunday

Christian Sunday observances
Holidays based on the date of Easter
January observances
February observances